James Joseph Norton  is an American comedian, radio personality, actor, author, and television and podcast host. Norton has been the co-host of the podcast UFC Unfiltered with Matt Serra and the morning radio show Jim Norton & Sam Roberts on SiriusXM Radio since 2016, and The Chip Chipperson Podacast since 2017.

He gained initial prominence as third mic on the radio show Opie and Anthony, with Gregg "Opie" Hughes and Anthony Cumia, from 2001 to 2014.

After becoming a stand-up comedian in 1990, Norton spent his early years developing his act. His appearances on The Louie Show caught the attention of comedian Andrew Dice Clay in 1997, who chose Norton to open for him for his shows. In 2000, Norton made his debut on Opie and Anthony and joined the show as a third mic in 2001 which increased his national exposure. He went on to have a recurring role on the sitcom Lucky Louie and featured as a regular panellist on Tough Crowd with Colin Quinn. Since he joined SiriusXM with Opie and Anthony in 2004, Norton hosted Opie with Jim Norton from 2014 to 2016, and The Jim Norton Advice Show.

Since 2003, Norton has released four comedy albums and seven comedy specials, including three on Epix and one on Netflix. In 2014, Norton hosted The Jim Norton Show, a talk show on Vice. He has written two books: Happy Endings: The Tales of a Meaty-Breasted Zilch and I Hate Your Guts.

Early life
James Joseph Norton was born in Bayonne, New Jersey. His mother was a librarian and his father was a former US marine and army reservist who later worked as a driver for the US postal service. Norton grew up in North Brunswick, New Jersey with his sister Tracy.

Norton attended North Brunswick High School, from which he dropped out in his senior year. During this time, at age 13, Norton started to drink heavily, "mostly vodka and grain alcohol" because it got him drunk quicker. "That feeling of discomfort that was always there, wasn't there when I drank. It was just a way of feeling comfortable ... I was horribly insecure, horribly shy, always feeling ugly and weak". At 16, Norton started to cut himself with a razor blade in an attempt at "attention-seeking ... It was "notice me!" crap. I was 16, 17, and drunk. I never did that stuff sober". He then missed some schooling, including his graduation from high school, after his alarmed parents sent him to a rehab facility in Princeton, New Jersey for one month, where he continued to sneak in alcohol but changed his thinking and completed the course at 18. When he was away, his class had voted him as class clown. Norton had his last drink at New Year's Eve 1985 going into 1986, and has been alcohol and drug free since. Norton's addictive personality began to direct towards sex after he got sober.

After being sober for around three years, Norton obtained his GED and attended Middlesex County College with the aim of pursuing a Juris Doctor degree and becoming a lawyer, but quit after one month. He earned a B grade in English and failing grades in Problems and Statistics, Science, and Western Civilization. At 18, he took up work in a copper company, operating a forklift to unload boxed tubes of copper from trucks, which he remembered as being "awful". He was fired from the job at age 23. Norton collected unemployment benefits for several years, pretending to look for work while doing sets in local comedy venues, before he decided to pursue comedy full-time.

Career

Stand-up
Norton wished to pursue a career as a stand-up comedian when he was 12. He took an interest to comedy after his mother brought home comedy albums from work, and names Richard Pryor, George Carlin, Woody Allen, and Robert Klein as his influences. Norton performed his first stand-up routine in April 1990 at an open mic night at Varsity, a pub in Sayreville, New Jersey, when he was 21. He later described his performance as "awful". Norton credited Pat Gaynor for putting him on stage that night, and Ward and John Magnuson of Rascals comedy club as being "instrumental" in his early development. Following his debut, Norton spent five years working on his stand-up traveling to New York, New Jersey, Boston, Pennsylvania, Maryland, and Florida with comedians Jim Florentine and Bob Levy, who were coming up at the same time. Norton developed an act based on self-deprecating humor, which came naturally to him and gained encouragement when other comedians told him they enjoyed it. Around ten years into stand-up, Norton felt he had found his voice and felt comfortable enough on stage.

Norton had a breakthrough in 1997 after comedian Andrew Dice Clay noticed his appearance on The Louie Show and asked him to be his opening act on his tours when his original pick cancelled at the last minute. The two first met at the Comedy Store in Los Angeles where Norton was doing his first gig at the venue, and learned Clay wished to go on stage after him. Norton went on to open for Clay in the course of the following three years, playing large venues including Madison Square Garden in New York City in 2000.

The absence of Opie and Anthony from the airwaves between August 2002 and October 2004 encouraged Norton to write and develop his stand-up act. Soon after the show's cancellation, he underwent his Yellow Discipline Tour. In 2003, he had assembled a new 45-minute set and assembled his first comedy album, Yellow Discipline, which was followed by Trinkets I Own Made from Gorilla Hands, in April 2005. Soon after, Norton filmed his first half-hour HBO comedy special as part of the network's One Night Stand series, at NYU's Skirball Center for the Performing Arts after his manager informed him of the chance to perform a showcase in the New York City area. In 2004, Norton was voted best comedian and breakthrough performer of the year on Cringe Humor. Following his return to radio in 2004, Norton began a weekday routine of doing radio in the morning and performing short sets in a New York City comedy club, mostly the Comedy Cellar, in the evening to work on new material. From 2006 to 2008, Norton featured on every show of the annual Opie and Anthony's Traveling Virus Comedy Tour. In 2008, Norton hosted a four-part show on HBO titled Down and Dirty with Jim Norton that featured Lemmy as its musical director. He had Amy Schumer be his opening act in her early career.

Norton had a productive start in the 2010s, writing and releasing three, hour long specials in three and-a-half years. He released his first, Please Be Offended on the television channel Epix in June 2012, and features Ozzy Osbourne sitting on a toilet introducing Norton. He chose the network as they allowed him complete creative freedom and were willing to promote his product. Norton followed it with American Degenerate, his second for Epix, which aired in August 2013 before it was released on Netflix that November. In April 2015, Norton released his fourth Epix special, Contextually Inadequate. Within three months of its release, Norton was touring with a new hour of material. In the following year, Norton described his career as "stagnant... there's nothing happening".

In 2017, Norton's special A Mouthful of Shame debuted on Netflix. He promoted it with the 31-date Mouthful of Shame Tour, his first nationwide theatre tour as headliner, throughout 2016. The special includes an opening with Robert De Niro spanking Norton's bare bottom. Later in 2017, Norton embarked on his first stand-up tour of Europe. He signed with WME to pitch ideas for his own series on Netflix. He appeared in Season 2, Episode 1 of the Netflix standup comedy series "The Degenerates", released on 31 December 2019.

Radio and podcasts

In early 2001, Norton was hired as the third mic on the Opie and Anthony radio show on WNEW in New York City, with hosts Gregg "Opie" Hughes and Anthony Cumia. He resisted calling himself a "host" of the show as he believes his strongest performances were when he was "an outsider looking in". He first appeared on the show in 2000 with Clay during his time opening for him on tour and became a regular guest and sat in on some shows. In November 2000, Norton was arrested with comedian Lewis Black and show producer Rick Del Gado during their live reports on board the Teen Voyeur Bus, a transparent bus of topless women driving around the city. It so happened that the bus' route was also the route that President Bill Clinton was taking that day, but the show was not informed of the news. Norton spent the night in jail. In August 2002, the show was cancelled following the controversial Sex for Sam 3 segment and remained off the air for two years. Norton returned to the radio with Hughes and Cumia on XM Satellite Radio, an uncensored satellite radio service, in October 2004. Cumia said Norton contributed a "dark and perverse" side to the show.

In October 2008, Norton was sued by New York City attorney Roy Den Hollander over his treatment during a phone interview on Opie and Anthony. In August 2009, The New York Post reported that Hollander was willing to drop his suit if Norton would also drop his motion to have Hollander sanctioned for filing a baseless claim, as well as being forced to pay Norton's legal fees.

On December 2, 2009, Norton had an on-air argument with Jesse Ventura about the September 11 attacks and measures against illegal immigration. Ventura was arguing against what Norton claimed was the Border Patrol practice of stopping individuals and asking them to produce ID deep within US borders, claiming that such actions were unconstitutional. At some point, when Norton disagreed with him on this, Ventura suggested that Norton did not believe in the Constitution to which Norton strongly objected. Soon after, as the argument became more heated, Ventura walked off the air and the two exchanged explicit comments towards each other.

In May 2010, The Jim Norton Show premiered on the Raw Dog Comedy channel on SiriusXM. The show featured Norton as the host with other comedians plus clips of live stand-up.

After Cumia was fired from SiriusXM in July 2014, Hughes and Norton continued to broadcast and became the hosts of Opie with Jim Norton, during which time the channel was renamed Opie Radio. Norton quickly missed working with Cumia, disliked the title of the re-branded program, and felt that he had not taken over the vacant spot left by Cumia, but rather was a voice on a show hosted by Hughes. The show ended in September 2016. During this time, Norton also hosted a weekly advice show on SiriusXM named The Jim Norton Advice Show.

In October 2016, Norton became the host of Jim Norton & Sam Roberts with former Opie and Anthony intern and producer Sam Roberts. Norton has a nightly one-hour playlist segment on Ozzy's Boneyard, a channel on SiriusXM, named Obsessed that airs his favourite tracks.

In mid-2016, Norton ended an online crowdfunding campaign via Indiegogo for the production of The Chip Chipperson Show, an animated web series based on the same titled character that he does on the radio. He started the character as a way of hassling his girlfriend. He had received many requests to have the concept animated, and launched the project to have five full episodes made by Big Hug Productions. Norton voiced the character in the series that also featured his other characters, including Uncle Paul Harghis, Jelly, Edgar Mellencamp, and Ted Scheckler. The fund raised over $61,000 from 724 donators.

In May 2016, Norton became the co-host of UFC Unfiltered, the first Ultimate Fighting Championship audio podcast, with former fighter Matt Serra. The pair record two episodes each week. The first episode launched on June 21, 2016, and has since run for over 550 episodes. Norton then launched his own weekly audio and video podcast based on his Chip Chipperson character, on the Riotcast network. The Chip Chipperson Podacast launched on April 9, 2017. In May 2020, Norton debuted the Doug Bellcast, a new podcast based on his new character, Doug Bell.

Television
In 1997, Norton appeared on The Louie Show starring Louie Anderson. From 2002 to 2004, Norton was a regular performer on the comedy series Tough Crowd with Colin Quinn. He then lost his place on the second season of Last Comic Standing in 2004 because of a contractual obligation to film pilot episodes for MTV which he had secured following the success of his One Night Stand special. The two pilots were Camp Cool, filmed in Cancun for MTV Spring Break, also starring Al Shearer about helping men meet women, and Stupid Bets. His manager advised him not to compete in Last Comic Standing as it was a reality show, but he agreed as he was depressed and frustrated with the uncertainty of his career as Opie and Anthony had been cancelled. Norton had a contract with Viacom during this time.

In September 2004, Norton made his first appearance on The Tonight Show with Jay Leno, and appeared twice more by mid-2006. He has appeared many times since, including as a correspondent named "The Uninvited Guest". In April 2005, Norton starred in a pilot episode for Louis C.K.'s HBO sitcom Lucky Louie, playing as Louie's friend Rich. He landed the role after the series was picked up by the network and aired through 2006. In 2007, Norton co-hosted the AVN Awards with Jessica Drake. In June 2008, Norton appeared in several episodes of The Gong Show with Dave Attell as one of the celebrity judges. Since mid-2007, Norton has been a regular guest on Red Eye w/ Greg Gutfeld on Fox News which he later credited as a contributor in boosting turnouts to his comedy shows. In 2010, Norton guest-hosted Red Eye. Starting in 2010, Norton began appearing in Louis C.K.'s FX sitcom Louie. In 2010, Norton's role in Bored to Death was tailored by its creator Jonathan Ames, a fan of his. In 2013, Norton said he had pitched a television show about a sex addict radio show host, but it was not picked up.

In July 2014, Norton debuted his four-episode talk show, The Jim Norton Show, on Vice a first for the network. The show featured opening monologues, pre-recorded bits, and guest interviews including co-host Bailey Jay, comedians Dave Attell, Whitney Cummings, and Gilbert Gottfried; and Mike Tyson, Dana White, and "Freeway" Rick Ross. Norton had assistance with the writing from comedians Kurt Metzger and Jesse Joyce. Vice had expressed an interest in filming more episodes, but Norton became unsure if the network had enough time for the project as they had grown in size. Looking back on the project, Norton was pleased with its outcome and entered talks with regard to continuing the format with Vice and other networks. In 2015, Norton starred in an episode of Quinn's parody television series Cop Show. In April 2016, Norton revealed that he had shot two pilot episodes for a potential comedy series on the AMC channel. Though it was not picked up, the show was reworked into a discussion program where he hosts a panel who talk about a single subject for thirty minutes.

Books
In early 2007, Norton announced the near completion of his first book, a collection of stories of his life with anecdotes from his childhood and his comedy career. Happy Endings: The Tales of a Meaty-Breasted Zilch was released on July 10, 2007. It reached No. 4 on The New York Times Best Seller list under hardcover non-fiction, and entered the Amazon.com Top 10 for books the day it was released, peaking at No. 7.

Norton released his second book, I Hate Your Guts, on November 4, 2008. It reached No. 13 on The New York Times Best Seller list under hardcover non-fiction. He criticizes people in the book, including Al Sharpton, Keith Olbermann, and Steve Martin, which includes a rant that Norton later regretted and has since apologized for to Martin.

Film
In 2002, Norton appeared on the short film Crooks, a straight to video release about postal workers stealing stamps. Norton has had various cameo appearances such as in the 2002 film Spider-Man and the 2008 film Zack and Miri Make a Porno. He has also appeared in the films Furry Vengeance, Cop Out, and Special Correspondents. Norton recalled around 2003 being a time when his acting career had gained some momentum.

In 2016, Norton landed a role in From Nowhere, a critically acclaimed independent film about three teenagers from the Bronx. This was followed by an appearance in Pitching Tents. Norton had a pivotal role in the 2008 film Courting Condi, counseling Devin Ratray on how to win the heart of Condoleezza Rice.

Norton starred in the crime film The Irishman as a young Don Rickles who tells jokes to a crowd with Robert De Niro and Joe Pesci present. He landed the part without an audition, and De Niro requested that Norton perform his own material after using jokes from Rickles's act from the 1970s.

Personal life
In 2007, Norton bought an apartment in one of Donald Trump's buildings in the Upper West Side of New York City. He is a longtime fan of Ozzy Osbourne, Black Sabbath, and Kiss and is a close family friend of Osbourne and his wife Sharon. Norton is a supporter of prostitution and transgender people.

Selected works
Albums

DVDs/Specials

Books

Filmography

Actor

Writer

Self

References

Books

External links
 
 

Living people
Actors from Bayonne, New Jersey
Writers from Bayonne, New Jersey
People from North Brunswick, New Jersey
Radio personalities from New Jersey
American male comedians
American male actors
American podcasters
American stand-up comedians
American male video game actors
American male voice actors
Shock jocks
Shorty Award winners
20th-century American comedians
21st-century American comedians
20th-century American male actors
21st-century American male actors
21st-century American male writers
Year of birth missing (living people)